Tropic Electric is the second studio album by the Canadian/Jamaican singer Kreesha Turner. It was released on November 15, 2011, digitally and physically. Kreesha decided to release it as a double disc, one side Tropic, and the other 'Electric'. The 'Tropic' side was recorded in Jamaica, to capture a new type of genre, a mix of reggae and pop music. The 'Electric' side of the album is dedicated to fans who enjoyed the vibe on her previous album, Passion.
The album received mostly positive reviews, praising its Jamaican sound, but criticizing tracks 'I Feel My Darling', and 'Come My Way'.

The iTunes track listing was mislabeled, the track reading 'Killer In The Club' is actually '8 A.M.', and vice versa.

Singles
The first single from the album, "Rock Paper Scissors", was released on July 5, 2011. For unknown reasons, only the radio edit of the track appears on the album.
The second single, "I Could Stay", was released on October 24, 2011. The iTunes single only contains the radio edit, but the full version of the song can be heard on the album. The song peaked at 59 on the Canadian Hot 100. "I Could Stay" was noted by critics for referencing and sounding similar to Janet Jackson's "Runaway". On Sunday, February 5, 2012, Kreesha confirmed through her Mobile Backstage iPhone app that she had just finished shooting the music video for the third single off the album in Montreal. The third and last single on the album was the second track on the electric side of the album, the Shawn Desman produced 'Love Again'.

Track listing

References

2011 albums
Kreesha Turner albums